The 1992 Grand Prix motorcycle racing season was the 44th F.I.M. Road Racing World Championship season. Honda secured the constructor's title in all three categories.

Season summaries

500cc summary
Wayne Rainey won the 1992 World Championship for the third consecutive year on a Kenny Roberts Marlboro Yamaha, however he was largely outshone by a dominant Michael Doohan on his Rothmans Honda, and was only prevented from winning what would have been his first world title by injury.

Doohan won the first four opening rounds, the first he nearly didn't qualify for, due to tricky conditions in Suzuka, but ended up winning as Rainey crashed out in the rain. Rainey followed Doohan home in second in the following three races, still not fully fit due to a broken femur he had suffered at the end of the 1991 season. Daryl Beattie was third at his home race in Australia, riding as a replacement for Wayne Gardner, who injured himself in a crash in the opening round. There were also podiums for Crivillé on his Honda in the third round and Niall Mackenzie on his Team France Yamaha in the fourth round after Crivillé had crashed out of third from his home race at Jerez.

The fifth round at Mugello saw one of the only races of the season where the three best riders of the era - Rainey, Doohan and Kevin Schwantz were fully fit and able to battle it out. Schwantz had missed the third round due to injury but was able to take the victory at Mugello on his Lucky Strike Suzuki as Rainey crashed out whilst battling for the lead. Rainey did however win his first race of the season at Catalunya in round six, passing Doohan for victory with two laps remaining. The seventh round of the season saw Doohan get back to winning ways, but Rainey had to retire due to being unable to continue after riding in pain following a heavy practice fall.

The eighth round at Assen proved to be crucial to the title race. Rainey left the circuit during practice, still being unable to ride comfortably, all but conceding the title to Doohan. However Doohan was to have his own crash in practice, suffering a double-fracture of his right leg and ruling him out for five races. Gardner also injured himself in practice leaving the Rothmans Honda squad without a rider for the race. Schwantz was therefore favorite for the race, but was being heavily challenged by Cagiva's four time world champion and veteran Eddie Lawson. Lawson took both riders out of the race with a collision, which resulted in Schwantz suffering a broken arm. The series of events left a group of riders chasing a rare victory and it was Crivillé who took the win, the first of his career.

Rainey was back for the following round at the Hungaroring, but changeable weather conditions allowed Lawson to take Cagiva's first ever 500cc victory, and Lawson's last in a glittering career. Rainey got back to winning ways in France for the tenth round, however Gardner took a popular win at the British round, with Rainey in second. A patch of oil into the first turn catching out several riders including high flying Schwantz, and teammate Doug Chandler.

The penultimate round of the season saw the return of Doohan, however he was still not fully fit. Rainey won the race, and whilst Doohan was running in the top ten for periods, he wasn't able to maintain the pace and finished twelfth. In the final round Rainey needed to a two-point swing to win the world championship, and although Doohan managed a sterling effort to finish sixth, Rainey's third place was enough to secure him his third and final world title. John Kocinski, Rainey's teammate took his only win of the season, in his last race for Marlboro Roberts Yamaha, and promoted him to third in the world championship table, ahead of Schwantz. Chandler impressed in his first season in the series finishing fifth, whilst Gardner's strong performances when fit saw him good enough for sixth. Juan Garriga was a strong seventh on a Yamaha, with Crivillé impressing in his debut season in eighth, ahead of Lawson took ninth, ahead of Randy Mamola. At the end of 1992 several of the big names of the 80's retired - Lawson, Gardner, and Mamola all left the sport, for different reasons.

The factory Honda riders debuted the "big bang" engine, with the NSR500, where the firing order of the cylinders made the power come out in pulses. The benefit to this was in traction, allowing the tires to adhere between pulses, rather than spin because of the two-stroke 500’s peaky powerband. Yamaha came up with their own version for the 9th round and Suzuki had it available by mid-season, though Schwantz didn't use it initially. The "big bang" concept is still used in today's four-stroke MotoGP bikes.

250cc summary
Luca Cadalora claimed his second 250cc crown by a much larger margin than his previous title. He won five out of the first six races on his Rothmans Honda accumulating such a huge points lead that he could afford to be more conservative in the second half of the season. Fellow Italians Loris Reggiani and Pierfrancesco Chili provided Cadalora's strongest competition. Reggiani won two races on his factory Aprilia, whilst Chili put in a number of strong performances winning three races, but failing to finish on a number of occasions, and suffered the embarrassment of thinking he had claimed a podium in the fourth round at Jerez, only to realise he had slowed down prematurely and had in fact been warming down on the final lap. Helmut Bradl had a more disappointing 1992 season, having run Cadalora close for the title in the previous year, the German on the HB Honda failed to win a race, and was often off the pace, back in fifth in the championship standings. 1992 saw the emergence of several future 250cc stars, with Max Biaggi, Chili's teammate, winning several pole positions and winning the final round in his debut season and impressing more and more as the season progressed. Loris Capirossi made the step up from 125s to 250s for the 1992 season. He was largely off the pace at the start of the season as he wasn't given a full works Honda initially, but once provided with a Honda much closer to the performance of Cadalora's as he proved he had the speed to be a contender. Similarly, Doriano Romboni's performances improved in the final few races when his HB Honda was upgraded. Former 250 world champion Carlos Lavado retired at the end of the season having had a very low-key 1992, rarely appearing in the points.

125cc summary
Alessandro Gramigni won the first ever 125cc championship for Aprilia, in a tight championship. This was despite Gramigni suffering a broken leg in a road bike accident midway through the season and missing a couple of rounds. Former double 125 champion Fausto Gresini had been consistent throughout the season on his Marlboro Honda, but only won one race, finishing second in the championship. Gresini was looking in serious contention for the championship, but had a critical crash when running in second place in the French round. Honda's Ralf Waldmann finished third in the championship, but had led the series for most of the year having won three of the first four races. His dip in form after that saw him rarely finish on the podium in the second half of the season. Ezio Gianola won the most races in the class - four, yet a number of crashes and low finishes meant he finished fourth in the championship on his Honda, this was a marked up-turn in fortune for Gianola who had considered retiring after a disappointing 1991 season. Aprilia's Bruno Casanova also had a much better 1992 than the previous season, finishing fifth in the championship. His only win coming in the closest race of the season at Hockenheim, where the super fast slipstreaming circuit provided a classic 125 race with the lead changing hands almost every lap. Up and coming Dirk Raudies ended the season well with a victory in the penultimate round in Brazil, and 125 veteran Jorge Martinez became the seventh different winner of the season when he won the final round of the season in South Africa.

Rule changes and off track events
During 1992 Rainey created the International Motorcycle Racers’ Association (IMRA) to pressure track organizers for safety improvements. Michelin came back from a semi-withdrawal and supplied tires to the Honda, Suzuki and Yamaha teams. The points system was revised to award points to the top 10 finishers only, instead of the top 15. This system would last for only the 1992 season, a slightly modified version being brought in for 1993, that is still used today.

The calendar was shortened to 13 rounds, with the United States, Czechoslovakia, Yugoslavia and Austria losing their races. The South African Grand Prix was added and the European Grand Prix continued for another year.

1992 Grand Prix season calendar
The official 1992 calendar was approved on 28 February 1992. The following Grands Prix were scheduled to take place in 1992:

Calendar changes
 The United States, Austrian, San Marino and Czechoslovakian motorcycle Grand Prix races were taken off the calendar due to a demand from Bernie Ecclestone which started to meddle more with motorcycle racing affairs, along with the IRTA.
 The Hungarian Grand Prix was added to the calendar after a one-year absence on demand of Bernie Ecclestone, who wanted to get more F1 tracks on the calendar.
 The Brazilian Grand Prix was added on the calendar after a two-year absence. On demand of Bernie Ecclestone, the chosen track became the Interlagos circuit, instead of the previously used Goiânia circuit.
 The French Grand Prix moved from the Paul Ricard circuit to the Magny-Cours circuit on demand of Bernie Ecclestone.
 The South African Grand Prix returned on the calendar after a six-year absence due to apartheid policies in the country. The venue used was the new, redesigned Kyalami circuit.
 The Vitesse du Mans Grand Prix was taken off the calendar.
 The European Grand Prix moved from the Jarama circuit to the newly built Catalunya circuit.
 The Malaysian Grand Prix was moved forward, from 29 September to 19 April.

1992 Grand Prix season results

Grands Prix

Participants

500cc participants

250cc participants

125cc participants

Results and standings

500cc riders' standings
Scoring system
Points are awarded to the top ten finishers. A rider has to finish the race to earn points.

250cc standings

125cc standings

References
 Büla, Maurice & Schertenleib, Jean-Claude (2001). Continental Circus 1949-2000. Chronosports S.A. 

Grand Prix motorcycle racing seasons